Magaña is a Spanish surname.   include:

Aldo Magaña (born 1996), Mexican footballer
Álvaro Magaña (1925–2001), Salvadorean politician
Ángel Magaña (1915–1982), Argentine actor
Angela Magaña (born 1983), American mixed martial artist 
Brenda Magaña (born 1977), Mexican gymnast
Cristian Magaña (born 1991), Chilean footballer
Delia Magaña (1903–1996), Mexican actress, singer and dancer
Eduardo Magaña (born 1984), Mexican archer
Gildardo Magaña (1891–1939), Mexican general, politician and revolutionary
Gumersindo Magaña (1939–2013), Mexican politician
Israel Ledesma Magaña (1954–2014), Mexican politician
José Luis Valle Magaña (born 1959), Mexican politician
Kevin Magaña (born 1998), Mexican footballer 
Mardonio Magaña (c.1865–1947), Mexican educator and sculptor
Margarita Magaña (born 1979), Mexican actress and model
Oscar Magaña (born 1987), Chilean footballer
Raúl Magaña (1940–2009), Salvadoran footballer and manager
Diego Magaña Tejero (born 1982), Spanish winemaker

Surnames of Spanish origin